Shurabad (also Romanized as Shūrābād; also known as Qal‘eh-ye Shūrābeh) is a village in Now Bandegan Rural District, Now Bandegan District, Fasa County, Fars Province, Iran. At the 2006 census, its population was 252, in 47 families.

References 

Populated places in Fasa County